German submarine U-432 was a Type VIIC U-boat of Nazi Germany's Kriegsmarine during World War II.

She carried out eight patrols.

She sank 20 ships and one warship. Two ships were damaged.

She was a member of seven wolfpacks.

She was sunk by a French warship in mid-Atlantic on 11 March 1943.

Design
German Type VIIC submarines were preceded by the shorter Type VIIB submarines. U-432 had a displacement of  when at the surface and  while submerged. She had two shafts and two  propellers.

U-432 was fitted with five  torpedo tubes (four fitted at the bow and one at the stern), fourteen torpedoes, one  SK C/35 naval gun, 220 rounds, and a  C/30 anti-aircraft gun. The boat had a complement of between forty-four and sixty.

Service history
The submarine was laid down on 14 January 1940 at Schichau-Werke in Danzig (now Gdansk) as yard number 1473, launched on 3 February 1941 and commissioned on 26 April 1941 under the command of Kapitänleutnant Heinz-Otto Schultze.

She served with the 3rd U-boat Flotilla from 26 April 1941 for training and stayed with that organization from 1 August for operations until her loss.

First patrol
U-432s first patrol was preceded by short 'hops' from Kiel in Germany to Horten Naval Base then Trondheim in Norway. Her first patrol proper began with her departure from Trondheim on 25 August 1941 and headed for the Atlantic Ocean via the gap between Iceland and the Faroe Islands.

The boat sank the Winterwijk on 10 September east of Greenland. She went on to sink the Stargad close by on the same date. The next day she sank the Garm northeast of the previous successes.

She docked at Brest in occupied France on 19 September.

Second and third patrols
On her second foray, she sank the Ulea on 28 October 1941 east-northeast of the Azores. She finished the patrol in St. Nazaire on 2 November 1941.

The boat's third sortie commenced with her departure from St. Nazaire on 10 December 1941. This was not only the shortest patrol of her career but the only time she returned to France, (this time to La Pallice where she would be based for the rest of her time), without success, on the 23rd.

Fourth patrol
Her fourth patrol was carried out on the eastern seaboard of Canada and the United States, where she sank a number of ships, including the-then neutral Brazilian vessels Buarque and the Olinda on 15 and 18 February 1942 respectively.

Fifth patrol
U-432 had departed La Pallice on 30 April 1942. On 2 May, she was slightly damaged in an air attack on 2 May west of the Bay of Biscay. She returned to her earlier hunting grounds across the Atlantic where she sank ships such as the Zurichmoor (on the 23rd) and the Malayan Prince on 9 June.

On 30 May, she torpedoed and sank the "Liverpool Packet" off the south-eastern tip of Nova Scotia. Of her 21 crew, two were killed when the torpedo struck. U-432 approached the 19 survivors, who had taken to lifeboats, and Schultze gave them directions to the nearest land. After 20 hours rowing, they succeeded in reaching Seal Island, off Cape Sable, Nova Scotia.

Sixth patrol
The submarine encountered some resistance when she came across the Pennmar off Cape Farewell (Greenland) on 24 September 1942. A torpedo fired from the starboard quarter was avoided by evasive action. On surfacing, the U-boat was engaged by Pennmars 4 in gun. U-432 submerged again and fired a spread of four torpedoes, one of which hit and sank the American ship.

Seventh patrol
For her seventh effort, the boat headed towards Africa. She sank the Poitou off Morocco on 17 December 1942.

Eighth patrol and loss
U-432 sank  on 11 March 1943 after the British destroyer was badly damaged while ramming . The  came to Harvesters assistance. She depth charged and sank the U-boat in mid-Atlantic.

Twenty-six men went down with U-432; there were 20 survivors.

Wolfpacks
U-432 took part in seven wolfpacks, namely:
 Markgraf (28 August – 14 September 1941) 
 Reissewolf (21 – 28 October 1941) 
 Pfadfinder (21 – 27 May 1942) 
 Lohs (23 August – 22 September 1942) 
 Sturmbock (23 – 26 February 1943) 
 Wildfang (26 February – 5 March 1943) 
 Westmark (6 – 11 March 1943)

Summary of raiding history

References

Notes

Citations

Bibliography

External links

German Type VIIC submarines
U-boats commissioned in 1941
U-boats sunk in 1943
U-boats sunk by depth charges
U-boats sunk by French warships
1941 ships
Ships built in Danzig
World War II submarines of Germany
Maritime incidents in March 1943
Ships built by Schichau